East Vinod Nagar is a residential colony situated adjacent to Mayur Vihar Phase-II, Sanjay Lake Park and Kalyan Vas Janta Flats in East Delhi, India.

Divided into two parts East and West Vinod Nagar. It is situated across the Yamuna River, practically minutes away from Connaught Place and Hazrat Nizamuddin railway station.

Notable people
 Yogesh Bhati won Bronze Medal in 100 kg Weight in Asian Cadet Wrestling Championship at Bangkok, Thailand in 2010.
http://zeenews.india.com/sports/others/indian-wrestlers-win-nine-medals-at-asian-cadet-cship_645351.html
http://wrestlingfederationofindia.com/view_results.php?id=30&type=national

References

External links
 

East Delhi district